The 2019 Czech Darts Open was the ninth of thirteen PDC European Tour events on the 2019 PDC Pro Tour. The tournament took place at the PVA Expo Praha, Prague, Czech Republic, from 28 to 30 June 2019. It featured a field of 48 players and £140,000 in prize money, with £25,000 going to the winner.

Jamie Hughes won his first PDC title with an 8–3 win over Stephen Bunting in the final.

Gerwyn Price hit the fourth nine-dart finish of the 2019 European Tour to beat Glen Durrant 6–4 in the second round. It was also the first of Price's career.

The tournament saw a new European tour record for the most seeded players losing their first match as 11 of 16 players including Michael van Gerwen and Peter Wright lost in the second round. The previous record was set by the 2017 Dutch Darts Masters which involved 9 seeds being eliminated.

It was the first ever PDC tournament held in the Czech Republic.

Prize money
This is how the prize money is divided:

 Seeded players who lose in the second round do not receive this prize money on any Orders of Merit.

Qualification and format
The top 16 entrants from the PDC ProTour Order of Merit on 11 June will automatically qualify for the event and will be seeded in the second round.

The remaining 32 places will go to players from six qualifying events – 18 from the UK Tour Card Holder Qualifier (held on 21 June), six from the European Tour Card Holder Qualifier (held on 21 June), two from the West & South European Associate Member Qualifier (held on 19 May), four from the Host Nation Qualifier (held on 27 June), one from the Nordic & Baltic Qualifier (held on 8 March), and one from the East European Qualifier (held on 27 June).

From 2019, the Host Nation, Nordic & Baltic and East European Qualifiers will only be available to non-Tour Card holders. Any Tour Card holders from the applicable regions will have to play the main European Qualifier.

The following players will take part in the tournament:

Top 16
  Michael van Gerwen (second round)
  Ian White (quarter-finals)
  Gerwyn Price (third round)
  Daryl Gurney (quarter-finals)
  Peter Wright (second round)
  James Wade (second round)
  Adrian Lewis (second round)
  Mensur Suljović (quarter-finals)
  Ricky Evans (second round)
  Steve Beaton (second round)
  Michael Smith (second round)
  Joe Cullen (second round)
  Jonny Clayton (second round)
  Simon Whitlock (semi-finals)
  Nathan Aspinall (second round)
  Darren Webster (second round)

UK Qualifier
  Glen Durrant (second round)
  Mervyn King (quarter-finals)
  Stephen Bunting (runner-up)
  Chris Dobey (third round)
  John Henderson (second round)
  William O'Connor (second round)
  Andrew Gilding (third round)
  Keegan Brown (semi-finals)
  Steve West (first round)
  Ted Evetts (third round)
  Corey Cadby (third round)
  Devon Petersen (first round)
  Justin Pipe (second round)
  Kevin Garcia (first round)
  Jamie Hughes (champion)
  Robert Thornton (first round)
  William Borland (first round)
  Brendan Dolan (first round)

European Qualifier
  Krzysztof Ratajski (first round)
  Jermaine Wattimena (third round)
  Rowby-John Rodriguez (first round)
  Madars Razma (first round)
  Danny Noppert (third round)
  Ron Meulenkamp (third round)

West/South European Qualifier
  Stefan Bellmont (first round)
  Wessel Nijman (first round)

Host Nation Qualifier
  Jan Hlaváček (first round)
  Václav Schieferdecker (first round)
  Ondřej Plšek (first round)
  Karel Sedláček (second round)

Nordic & Baltic Qualifier
  Daniel Larsson (first round)

East European Qualifier
  Sebastian Steyer (first round)

Draw

References

2019 PDC Pro Tour
2019 PDC European Tour
2019 in Czech sport
June 2019 sports events in Europe
Darts in the Czech Republic